Graciete Moreira Carneiro Santana (12 October 1980 – 16 September 2021) was a Brazilian long distance runner. She placed 128th in the 2016 Olympics marathon. Santana took up running to help her overcome bulimia.

References

External links

 

1980 births
2021 deaths
Brazilian female long-distance runners
Brazilian female marathon runners
Place of birth missing
Athletes (track and field) at the 2016 Summer Olympics
Olympic athletes of Brazil
Sportspeople from Bahia
Deaths from melanoma
Place of death missing
Deaths from cancer in Brazil
20th-century Brazilian women
21st-century Brazilian women